Karl-Heinz Langer (19 April 1914 – 6 May 1955) was a Luftwaffe ace and recipient of the Knight's Cross of the Iron Cross during World War II. The Knight's Cross of the Iron Cross was awarded to recognise extreme battlefield bravery or successful military leadership.  During his career he was credited with 30 aerial victories in 486 missions, 10 on the Western Front and 20 on the Eastern Front.

Career
Langer was appointed Staffelkapitän (squadron leader) of 7. Staffel (7th squadron) of Jagdgeschwader 3 (JG 3—3rd Fighter Wing) on 1 June 1943. He succeeded Oberleutnant Eberhard von Boremski who was wounded in combat the day before. In this engagement, his Messerschmitt Bf 109 G-6 (Werknummer 26924—factory number) was shot down by defensive fire. Langer was forced to bail out near Hammelburg. Due to the injuries sustained, he was replaced by Leutnant Erwin Stahlberg as leader of 7. Staffel.

On 21 May 1944, Langer was appointed Gruppenkommandeur (group commander) of III. Gruppe (2nd group) of JG 3. He succeeded Major Walther Dahl who was transferred.

Summary of career

Aerial victory claims
Langer was credited with 30 aerial victories claimed in 486 combat missions. Mathews and Foreman, authors of Luftwaffe Aces — Biographies and Victory Claims, researched the German Federal Archives and found documentation for 29 aerial victory claims, plus one further unconfirmed claim. This number includes ten on the Western Front, including four four-engined bombers, and 19 on the Eastern Front.

Victory claims were logged to a map-reference (PQ = Planquadrat), for example "PQ 4056". These sectors were then subdivided into 36 smaller units to give a location area 3 × 4 km in size.

Awards
 Aviator badge
 Front Flying Clasp of the Luftwaffe
 Honour Goblet of the Luftwaffe (12 August 1944)
 Iron Cross (1939) 2nd and 1st Class
 German Cross in Gold on 26 July 1944 as Hauptmann in the III./Jagdgeschwader 3
 Knight's Cross of the Iron Cross on 20 April 1945 as Major and Gruppenkommandeur of the III./Jagdgeschwader 3 "Udet"

References

Citations

Bibliography

External links
Aces of the Luftwaffe
TracesOfWar.com

1914 births
1955 deaths
People from Görlitz
Luftwaffe pilots
German World War II flying aces
Recipients of the Gold German Cross
Recipients of the Knight's Cross of the Iron Cross
People from the Province of Silesia
Military personnel from Saxony